The 1997 European Weightlifting Championships were held in Rijeka, Croatia for the men. The women competition were held in Sevilla, Spain. It was the 76th edition of the men event, and the 10th for the women.

Medal overview

Men

Women

European Weightlifting Championships
European Weightlifting Championships, 1997
Weightlifting Championships, 1997
International weightlifting competitions hosted by Spain
European Weightlifting Championships, 1997
International weightlifting competitions hosted by Croatia